Grace is the only studio album by American singer-songwriter Jeff Buckley, released on August 23, 1994, by Columbia Records. The album had poor sales and received mixed reviews at the time of its release. However, in recent years it has dramatically risen in critical reputation. An extended version of the album (subtitled "Legacy Edition"), celebrating its tenth anniversary, was released on August 23, 2004, and peaked at number 44 in the UK.

Grace re-entered the albums chart in Australia at number 44 for the week of January 29 to February 5, 2007, 13 years after its original release date. It is currently certified 8× platinum in Australia. The album has been cited by critics and listeners as one of the greatest albums of all time.

Music
Buckley's version of "Corpus Christi Carol" was based on a version by Janet Baker. A childhood friend introduced him to the song, and Buckley sang a version on the album as a way of thanking him.

Critical reception and legacy

Grace has been highly rated in magazines such as Q, in which readers voted Grace the 75th greatest album of all time in 1998; the same vote was taken again in 2005 and Grace then ranked 13th. In 2003, the album was ranked number 303 on Rolling Stone's list of the 500 greatest albums of all time, and 304 in a 2012 revised list, and later 147 in the 2020 list. In 2006, Mojo named Grace the No. 1 Modern Rock Classic of All Time. It was also rated as Australia's second favourite album on My Favourite Album, a television special aired by the Australian Broadcasting Corporation on December 3, 2006. In 2003, Buckley's cover of Leonard Cohen's "Hallelujah" was ranked No. 259 on Rolling Stone's list of the 500 greatest songs of all time. VH1 also rated the album No. 73 on its "100 Greatest Albums of Rock & Roll" show/list. It was voted number 99 in the third edition of Colin Larkin's All Time Top 1000 Albums (2000). Larkin stated "his music achieved a perfection that was staggering for a debut album."

Grace won appreciation from a host of revered musicians and artists, including members of Buckley's biggest influence, Led Zeppelin. Jimmy Page considered Grace close to being his "favorite album of the decade". Robert Plant was also complimentary, as was Brad Pitt, saying of Buckley's work, "There's an undercurrent to his music, there's something you can't pinpoint. Like the best of films, or the best of art, there's something going on underneath, and there's a truth there. And I find his stuff absolutely haunting. It just... it's under my skin."
Others who had influenced Buckley's music lauded him: Bob Dylan named Buckley "one of the great songwriters of this decade", and David Bowie considered Grace to be the best album ever made, and had said it would be one of his ten "Desert Island Records."

In 2006, British Hit Singles & Albums and NME organised a poll of which, 40,000 people worldwide voted for the 100 best albums ever and Grace was placed at No. 23 on the list.

On 2 April 2014 it was announced that Buckley's version of "Hallelujah" would be inducted into the Library of Congress' National Recording Registry (the entire album hasn't yet been inducted).

In July 2014, Guitar World ranked Grace at number 26 in their "Superunknown: 50 Iconic Albums That Defined 1994" list.

Based on Graces appearances in professional rankings and listings, the aggregate website Acclaimed Music lists it as the most acclaimed album of 1994, the 7th most acclaimed album of the 1990s and the 58th most acclaimed album in history.

Accolades

* denotes an unranked list.

Singles and EPs
Four proper singles were released from the album, along with additional editions, two posthumous releases, and promo-only releases (see also: The Grace EPs).

Posthumous
Buckley's cover version of "Hallelujah" re-entered the UK Singles Chart at number 2 during Christmas 2008, following the release of another cover version by series 5 of the British version of The X Factor winner Alexandra Burke which took the number 1 slot.

Singles
 "Forget Her" (August 2004)
 "Hallelujah" (May 2007)

Track listing

To promote Buckley's 1995 Australian tour, a two-CD edition was issued. It featured the following songs on the second disc:
 "So Real" – live and acoustic in Japan, January 1995
 "Dream Brother" – live in Hamburg at Club Logo, 22 February 1995
 "Grace" – live at the Shepherd's Bush Empire, London, 4 March 1995 (exclusive to this release)
 "Mojo Pin" – live at Wetlands, New York City, November 1994

Legacy Edition

Track listing
Disc one: Remastered edition of the original 10-track album.

Personnel
Credits adapted from Grace's liner notes.
Music credits
 Karl Berger – string arrangements
 Jeff Buckley – vocals, guitar, keyboards, dulcimer, percussion
 Mick Grøndahl – bass
 Loris Holland – organ (track 7)
 Matt Johnson – percussion, drums, vibraphone (track 10)
 Gary Lucas – "Magical Guitarness" (tracks 1, 2)
 Misha Masud – tabla (track 10)
 Michael Tighe – guitar (track 5)
Technical personnel
 Christopher Austopchuk – art direction, design
 Steve Berkowitz – executive producer
 Jeff Buckley – producer (track 5)
 Jennifer Cohen – design assistant
 Merri Cyr – photography
 David Gahr – photography
 Bryant W. Jackson – assistant engineer
 Chris Laidlaw – assistant engineer
 Nicky Lindeman – art direction, design
 Clif Norrell – engineer
 Steve Sisco – assistant engineer
 Andy Wallace – producer, engineer, mixing
Howie Weinberg – mastering

Charts

Weekly charts

Year-end charts

Certifications

Release history

Notes

References

External links
 

Jeff Buckley albums
1994 debut albums
Albums produced by Andy Wallace (producer)
Columbia Records albums